Salem Airport may refer to:

 Salem Airport (Arkansas) in Salem, Arkansas, United States (FAA: 7M9)
 Salem Airport (India) in Tamil Nadu, India (IATA: SXV)
 Salem Airpark in Salem, Ohio, United States (FAA: 38D)
 Salem-Leckrone Airport in Salem, Illinois, United States (FAA/IATA: SLO)
 Salem Memorial Airport in Salem, Missouri, United States (FAA: K33)

Salem Municipal Airport may refer to:
 Salem Municipal Airport (Indiana) in Salem, Indiana, United States (FAA: I83)
 Salem Municipal Airport (Oregon), also known as McNary Field, in Salem, Oregon, United States (FAA/IATA: SLE)

Airports in places named Salem:
 Koons Airport in Salem, Ohio, United States (FAA: 8G8)